Eugen Sandow (born Friedrich Wilhelm Müller, ; 2 April 1867 – 14 October 1925) was a German bodybuilder and showman from Prussia. Born in Königsberg, Sandow became interested in bodybuilding at the age of ten during a visit to Italy. After a spell in the circus, Sandow studied under strongman Ludwig Durlacher in the late 1880s. On Durlacher's recommendation, he began entering strongman competitions, performing in matches against leading figures in the sport such as Charles Sampson, Frank Bienkowski, and Henry McCann. In 1901 he organised what is believed to be the world's first major bodybuilding competition. Set in London's Royal Albert Hall, Sandow judged the event alongside author Sir Arthur Conan Doyle and athlete/sculptor Charles Lawes-Wittewronge.

Early life
Sandow was born to a family of Jewish origin in Königsberg, Prussia (now Kaliningrad), on 2 April 1867. His father was German, while his mother was of Russian descent. Although his parents were born Jewish, the family were Lutherans and wanted him to become a Lutheran minister. He left Prussia in 1885 to avoid military service and traveled throughout Europe, becoming a circus athlete and adopting Eugen Sandow as his stage name, adapting and Germanizing his Russian mother's maiden name, Sandov.

In Brussels he visited the gym of a fellow strongman, Ludwig Durlacher, better known under his stage name "Professor Attila". Durlacher recognized Sandow's potential, mentored him, and in 1889 encouraged him to travel to London and take part in a strongmen competition. Sandow handily beat the reigning champion and won instant fame and recognition for his strength. This launched him on his career as an athletic superstar. Soon he was receiving requests from all over Britain for performances. For the next four years, Sandow refined his technique and crafted it into popular entertainment with posing and incredible feats of strength.

Career

Florenz Ziegfeld wanted to display Sandow at the 1893 World's Columbian Exposition in Chicago, but Ziegfeld knew that Maurice Grau had Sandow under a contract. Grau wanted $1,000 a week. Ziegfeld could not guarantee that much but agreed to pay 10 percent of the gross receipts.

Ziegfeld found that the audience was more fascinated by Sandow's bulging muscles than by the amount of weight he was lifting, so Ziegfeld had Sandow move in poses which he dubbed "muscle display performances" ... and the legendary strongman added these displays in addition to performing his feats of strength with barbells. He added chain-around-the-chest breaking and other colorful displays to Sandow's routine, and Sandow quickly became Ziegfeld's first star.

In 1894, Sandow was featured in a short film series by the Edison Studios. The film was of only part of his act and featured him flexing his muscles rather than performing any feats of physical strength.

While the content of the film reflected the audience's focus on his appearance, it made use of the unique capacities of the new medium. Film theorists have attributed the appeal being the striking image of a detailed image moving in synchrony, much like the example of the Lumière brothers' Repas de bébé where audiences were reportedly more impressed by the movement of trees swaying in the background than the events taking place in the foreground. In 1894, Sandow also appeared in a short Kinetoscope film that is now part of the Library of Congress.

In April of that same year Sandow gave one of his "muscle display performances" at the 1894 California Mid-Winter International Exposition in Golden Gate Park at the "Vienna Prater" Theater.

While he was on tour in the United States, Sandow made a brief return to England to marry Blanche Brooks, a girl from Manchester. However, due to stress and ill health he returned permanently to recuperate.

He was soon back on his feet, and opened the first of his Institutes of Physical Culture, where he taught methods of exercise, dietary habits and weight training. His ideas on physical fitness were novel at the time and had a tremendous impact. The Sandow Institute was an early gymnasium that was open to the public for exercise. In 1898 he also founded a monthly periodical, originally titled Physical Culture and subsequently renamed Sandow's Magazine of Physical Culture that was dedicated to all aspects of physical culture. This was accompanied by a series of books published between 1897 and 1904 – the last of which coined the term 'bodybuilding' in the title (as "body-building").

He worked hard at improving exercise equipment, and had invented various devices such as rubber strands for stretching and spring-grip dumbbells to exercise the wrists. In 1900 William Bankier wrote Ideal Physical Culture in which he challenged Sandow to a contest in weightlifting, wrestling, running and jumping. When Sandow did not accept his challenge Bankier called him a coward, a charlatan and a liar.

In 1901, Sandow organized the world's first major bodybuilding competition in London's Royal Albert Hall. The venue was so full that people were turned away from the door. The three judges presiding over the contest were Sir Charles Lawes the sculptor, Sir Arthur Conan Doyle the author, and Sandow himself.

In 1902, Sandow was defeated by Katie Brumbach in a weightlifting contest in New York City. Brumbach lifted a weight of 300 pounds over her head, which Sandow managed to lift only to his chest. After this victory, Brumbach adopted the stage name "Sandwina" as a feminine derivative of Sandow.

In 1906, Sandow was able to buy the lease of 161 (formerly 61) Holland Park Avenue, thanks to a generous gift from an Indian businessman, Sir Dhunjibhoy Bomanji, whose health had improved dramatically after he had adopted Sandow's regime. This grand four-storey end-of-terrace house – which was named Dhunjibhoy House after his benefactor – was his home for 19 years.

He travelled around the world on tours to countries as varied as South Africa, India, Japan, Australia, New Zealand. At his own expense, from 1909 he provided training for would-be recruits to the Territorial Army, to bring them up to entrance fitness standards, and did the same for volunteers for active service in World War I.

He was even designated special instructor in physical culture to King George V, who had followed his teachings, in 1911.

The Grecian Ideal

Sandow's resemblance to the physiques found on classical Greek and Roman sculpture was no accident, as he measured the statues in museums and helped to develop "The Grecian Ideal" as a formula for the "perfect physique". Sandow built his physique to the exact proportions of his Grecian Ideal, and is considered the father of modern bodybuilding, as one of the first athletes to intentionally develop his musculature to predetermined dimensions. In his books Strength and How to Obtain It and Sandow's System of Physical Training, Sandow laid out specific prescriptions of weights and repetitions in order to achieve his ideal proportions.

Personal life

Sandow married Blanche Brooks, daughter of the well-known photographer Warwick Brooks, of Manchester, England, in 1894.  They had two daughters, Helen and Lorraine.

Influence on yoga

Sandow was acclaimed on his 1905 visit to India, at which time he was already a "cultural hero" in the country at a time of strong nationalistic feeling. The scholar Joseph Alter suggests that Sandow was the person who had the most influence on modern yoga as exercise, which absorbed a variety of exercise routines from physical culture in the early 20th century.

Death

Sandow died at his home in Kensington, London, on 14 October 1925 of what newspapers announced as a brain hemorrhage at age 58. It was allegedly brought on after straining himself, without assistance, to lift his car out of a ditch after a road accident two or three years earlier. However, without an autopsy, his death was certified as due to aortic aneurysm.

Sandow was buried in an unmarked grave in Putney Vale Cemetery at the request of his wife, Blanche. It is rumoured that he was unfaithful to his wife later in marriage, and she refused to mark his grave, however the cause of this strife will always remain a mystery, as she refused to talk about what occurred between the two of them. In 2002, a gravestone and black marble plaque was added by Sandow admirer and author Thomas Manly. The inscription (in gold letters) read "Eugen Sandow, 1867–1925, the Father of Bodybuilding". In 2008, the grave was purchased by Chris Davies, Sandow's great-grandson. Manly's items were replaced for the anniversary of Sandow's birth that year and a new monument, a one-and-a-half-ton natural pink sandstone monolith, was put in its place. The stone, simply inscribed "SANDOW 1867–1925", is a reference to the ancient Greek funerary monuments called steles.

Legacy

Sandow was befriended by King George V, Thomas Edison, Sir Arthur Conan Doyle and classical pianist Martinus Sieveking. He was portrayed by the actor Nat Pendleton in the Academy Award-winning film The Great Ziegfeld (1936).

"Physical [sic] Strength and How to Obtain It by Eugen Sandow” appears as one of the books in the catalog of the personal bookshelves of Leopold Bloom in Chapter 17 (Ithaca, line 1397) of James Joyce's 1922 novel Ulysses. 

As recognition of his contribution to the sport of bodybuilding, a bronze statue of Sandow sculpted by Frederick Pomeroy has been presented to the winner of the Mr. Olympia contest, a major professional bodybuilding competition sponsored by the International Federation of Bodybuilders, since 1977. This statue is simply known as "The Sandow".

In 2013, Eugen Sandow was portrayed by the Canadian bodybuilder Dave Simard in the film Louis Cyr. In 2018, a film was made on Sandow's life, entitled Sandow.

Sandows (London) cold brew coffee is named after him.

English Heritage put up a blue plaque on his house at 161 Holland Park Avenue in west London in 2009; it describes him as a "Body-Builder and Promoter of Physical Culture".

Sandow (or a character modeled and named after him) appears in the eleventh episode of Season 3 of The Venture Bros., in which he is voiced by Paul Boocock and appears alongside other contemporary entertainers.

Publications
 Sandow, Eugen, "How to Preserve Health and Attain Strength," illustrated with photographs of the author, Cosmopolitan, vol. XVII, no. 2, June 1894, pp. 169-176.
 Sandow's System of Physical Training (1894)
 Sandow on Physical Training (1894)
 Strength and how to Obtain It (1897)
 Sandow's Magazine of Physical Culture (1898–1907)
 Body-Building
 Strength and Health
 The Construction and Reconstruction of the Human Body (1907) [with a foreword by Arthur Conan Doyle]
 Life is Movement (1919)

See also
 List of male professional bodybuilders
 List of female professional bodybuilders
 Strongman (strength athlete)

References

Further reading
 Barford, Vanessa and Lucy Townsend, Eugen Sandow: The man with the perfect body, BBC News Magazine, 19 October 2012
 Chapman, David, "Eugen Sandow and the Birth of Bodybuilding", Hardgainer (May 1993)
 Tate, Don, Strong As Sandow: How Eugen Sandow Became The Strongest Man On Earth, Charlesbridge Publishing, September 2017
 Waller, David, The Perfect Man: The Muscular Life and Times of Eugen Sandow, Victorian Strongman (Brighton: Victorian Secrets, 2011)

External links

 
 Eugen Sandow & The Golden Age of Iron Men
 His workout with video demonstrations
 
 
 
 Eugen Sandow in several famous poses: 1., 2., 3., 4., 5., 6., 7., 8., 9., 10.
 victorianstrongman.com

1867 births
1925 deaths
Articles containing video clips
Bodybuilding
Burials at Putney Vale Cemetery
German bodybuilders
German Lutherans
German people of Jewish descent
German people of Russian descent
German strength athletes
Music hall performers
People associated with physical culture
Sportspeople from Königsberg
People from the Province of Prussia
Professional bodybuilders
Strength training writers
Vaudeville performers